A pancake feed is an all-you-can-eat breakfast of pancakes popular in some United States locales including Minnesota and Nebraska. A record pancake feed serving over 38,000 people occurred in Fargo, North Dakota on February 9, 2008. American civic groups and amateur sports teams have traditionally used pancake feeds as fundraisers. In Seattle, they are associated with Swedish American and Norwegian American cultural societies and clubs. The Kiwanis pancake feed in Lincoln, Nebraska has been held continuously since the 1950s.

See also

 Pancake breakfast a similar, Canadian tradition
 Pancake Tuesday a religious institution of gorging on pancakes amongst Lutherans, Catholics and other Christian denominations

References

Cuisine of the Midwestern United States
Cuisine of the Western United States
American pancakes